The Oxyrhynchus Papyri are a group of manuscripts discovered during the late nineteenth and early twentieth centuries by papyrologists Bernard Pyne Grenfell and Arthur Surridge Hunt at an ancient rubbish dump near Oxyrhynchus in Egypt (modern el-Bahnasa).

The manuscripts date from the time of the Ptolemaic (3rd century BC) and Roman periods of Egyptian history (from 32 BC to the Muslim conquest of Egypt in 640 AD).

Only an estimated 10% are literary in nature. Most of the papyri found seem to consist mainly of public and private documents: codes, edicts, registers, official correspondence, census-returns, tax-assessments, petitions, court-records, sales, leases, wills, bills, accounts, inventories, horoscopes, and private letters.

Although most of the papyri were written in Greek, some texts written in Egyptian (Egyptian hieroglyphics, Hieratic, Demotic, mostly Coptic), Latin and Arabic were also found. Texts in Hebrew, Aramaic, Syriac and Pahlavi have so far represented only a small percentage of the total.

Since 1898, academics have collated and transcribed over 5,000 documents from what were originally hundreds of boxes of papyrus fragments the size of large cornflakes. This is thought to represent only 1 to 2% of what is estimated to be at least half a million papyri still remaining to be conserved, transcribed, deciphered and catalogued. The most recent published volume was Vol. LXXXVI, .

Oxyrhynchus Papyri are currently housed in institutions all over the world. A substantial number are housed in the Sackler Library at Oxford University. There is an online table of contents briefly listing the type of contents of each papyrus or fragment.

Administrative texts
Administrative documents assembled and transcribed from the Oxyrhynchus excavation so far include: 
 The contract of a wrestler agreeing to throw his next match for a fee.
 Various and sundry ancient recipes for treating haemorrhoids, hangovers and cataracts.
 Details of a grain dole mirroring a similar program in the Roman capital.

Secular texts
Although most of the texts uncovered at Oxyrhynchus were non-literary in nature, the archaeologists succeeded in recovering a large corpus of literary works that had previously been thought to have been lost. Many of these texts had previously been unknown to modern scholars.

Greek
Several fragments can be traced to the work of Plato, for instance the Republic, Phaedo, or the dialogue Gorgias, dated around 200–300 CE.

Historiography

The discovery of a historical work known as the Hellenica Oxyrhynchia also revealed new information about classical antiquity. The identity of the author of the work is unknown; many early scholars proposed that it may have been written by Ephorus or Theopompus but many modern scholars are now convinced that it was written by Cratippus. The work has won praise for its style and accuracy and has even been compared favorably with the works of Thucydides.

Mathematics

The findings at Oxyrhynchus also turned up the oldest and most complete diagrams from Euclid's Elements. Fragments of Euclid led to a re-evaluation of the accuracy of ancient sources for The Elements, revealing that the version of Theon of Alexandria has more authority than previously believed, according to Thomas Little Heath.

Drama

The classical author who has most benefited from the finds at Oxyrhynchus is the Athenian playwright Menander (342–291 BC), whose comedies were very popular in Hellenistic times and whose works are frequently found in papyrus fragments. Menander's plays found in fragments at Oxyrhynchus include Misoumenos, Dis Exapaton, Epitrepontes, Karchedonios, Dyskolos and Kolax. The works found at Oxyrhynchus have greatly raised Menander's status among classicists and scholars of Greek theatre.

Another notable text uncovered at Oxyrhynchus was Ichneutae, a previously unknown play written by Sophocles. The discovery of Ichneutae was especially significant since Ichneutae is a satyr play, making it only one of two extant satyr plays, with the other one being Euripides's Cyclops.

Extensive remains of the Hypsipyle of Euripides and a life of Euripides by Satyrus the Peripatetic were also found at Oxyrhynchus.

Poetry

 Poems of Pindar. Pindar was the first known Greek poet to reflect on the nature of poetry and on the poet's role.
 Fragments of Sappho, Greek poet from the island of Lesbos famous for her poems about love. 
 Fragments of Alcaeus,  an older contemporary and an alleged lover of Sappho, with whom he may have exchanged poems.
 Larger pieces of Alcman, Ibycus, and Corinna.
 Passages from Homer's Iliad. See Papyrus Oxyrhynchus 20 – Iliad II.730-828 and Papyrus Oxyrhynchus 21 – Iliad II.745-764

Latin
An epitome of seven of the 107 lost books of Livy was the most important literary find in Latin.

Christian texts

Among the Christian texts found at Oxyrhynchus, were fragments of early non-canonical Gospels, Oxyrhynchus 840 (3rd century AD) and Oxyrhynchus 1224 (4th century AD). Other Oxyrhynchus texts preserve parts of Matthew 1 (3rd century: P2 and P401), 11–12 and 19 (3rd to 4th century: P2384, 2385); Mark 10–11 (5th to 6th century: P3); John 1 and 20 (3rd century: P208); Romans 1 (4th century: P209); the First Epistle of John (4th-5th century: P402); the Apocalypse of Baruch (chapters 12–14; 4th or 5th century: P403); the Gospel of Thomas (3rd century AD: P655); The Shepherd of Hermas (3rd or 4th century: P404), and a work of Irenaeus, (3rd century: P405). There are many parts of other canonical books as well as many early Christian hymns, prayers, and letters also found among them.

All manuscripts classified as "theological" in the Oxyrhynchus Papyri are listed below. A few manuscripts that belong to multiple genres, or genres that are inconsistently treated in the volumes of the Oxyrhynchus Papyri, are also included. For example, the quotation from Psalm 90 (P. Oxy. XVI 1928) associated with an amulet, is classified according to its primary genre as a magic text in the Oxyrhynchus Papyri; however, it is included here among witnesses to the Old Testament text. In each volume that contains theological manuscripts, they are listed first, according to an English tradition of academic precedence (see Doctor of Divinity).

Old Testament

The original Hebrew Bible (Tanakh) was translated into Greek between the 3rd and 1st centuries BC. This translation is called the Septuagint (or LXX, both 70 in Latin), because there is a tradition that seventy Jewish scribes compiled it in Alexandria. It was quoted in the New Testament and is found bound together with the New Testament in the 4th and 5th century Greek uncial codices Sinaiticus, Alexandrinus and Vaticanus. The Septuagint included books, called the Apocrypha or Deuterocanonical by Christians, which were later not accepted into the Jewish canon of sacred writings (see next section). Portions of Old Testament books of undisputed authority found among the Oxyrhynchus Papyri are listed in this section.
The first number (Vol) is the volume of the Oxyrhynchus Papyri in which the manuscript is published.
The second number (Oxy) is the overall publication sequence number in Oxyrhynchus Papyri.
Standard abbreviated citation of the Oxyrhynchus Papyri is:
P. Oxy. <volume in Roman numerals> <publication sequence number>.
Context will always make clear whether volume 70 of the Oxyrhynchus Papyri or the Septuagint is intended.
P. Oxy. VIII 1073 is an Old Latin version of Genesis, other manuscripts are probably copies of the Septuagint.
Dates are estimated to the nearest 50 year increment.
Content is given to the nearest verse where known.

Old Testament Deuterocanon (or, Apocrypha)
This name designates several, unique writings (e.g., the Book of Tobit) or different versions of pre-existing writings (e.g., the Book of Daniel) found in the canon of the Jewish scriptures (most notably, in the Septuagint translation of the Hebrew Tanakh).  Although those writings were no longer viewed as having a canonical status amongst Jews by the beginning of the second century A.D., they retained that status for much of the Christian Church.  They were and are accepted as part of the Old Testament canon by the Catholic Church and Eastern Orthodox churches.  Protestant Christians, however, follow the example of the Jews and do not accept these writings as part of the Old Testament canon.

PP. Oxy. XIII 1594 and LXV 4444 are vellum ("vellum" noted in table).
Both copies of Tobit are different editions to the known Septuagint text ("not LXX" noted in table).

Other related papyri

New Testament

The Oxyrhynchus Papyri have provided the most numerous sub-group of the earliest copies of the New Testament. These are surviving portions of codices (books) written in Greek uncial (capital) letters on papyrus. The first of these were excavated by Bernard Pyne Grenfell and Arthur Surridge Hunt in Oxyrhynchus, at the turn of the 20th century. Of the 127 registered New Testament papyri, 52 (41%) are from Oxyrhynchus. The earliest of the papyri are dated to the middle of the 2nd century, so were copied within about a century of the writing of the original New Testament documents.

Grenfell and Hunt discovered the first New Testament papyrus, on only the second day of excavation, in the winter of 1896–7. This, together with the other early discoveries, was published in 1898, in the first volume of the now 86-volume work, The Oxyrhynchus Papyri.

The third column (CRG) refers to the now standard sequences of Caspar René Gregory.
𝔓 indicates a papyrus manuscript, a number beginning with zero indicates vellum.
The CRG number is an adequate abbreviated citation for New Testament manuscripts.
Content is given to the nearest chapter; verses are sometimes listed.

New Testament Apocrypha
The Oxyrhynchus Papyri collection contains around twenty manuscripts of New Testament apocrypha, works from the early Christian period that presented themselves as biblical books, but were not eventually received as such by the orthodoxy. These works found at Oxyrhynchus include the gospels of Thomas, Mary, Peter, James, The Shepherd of Hermas, and the Didache. (All of these are known from other sources as well.) Among this collection are also a few manuscripts of unknown gospels. The three manuscripts of Thomas represent the only known Greek manuscripts of this work; the only other surviving manuscript of Thomas is a nearly complete Coptic manuscript from the Nag Hammadi find. P. Oxy. 4706, a manuscript of The Shepherd of Hermas, is notable because two sections believed by scholars to have been often circulated independently, Visions and Commandments, were found on the same roll.

 P. Oxy. V 840 and P. Oxy. XV 1782 are vellum
 2949?, 3525, 3529? 4705, and 4706 are rolls, the rest codices.

Other related texts
Four exact dates are marked in bold type:
three libelli are dated: all to the year 250, two to the month, and one to the day;
a warrant to arrest a Christian is dated to 28 February 256.

See also

List of early Christian writers
List of Egyptian papyri by date
List of New Testament minuscules
List of New Testament papyri
List of New Testament uncials
Novum Testamentum Graece
Palaeography
Papyrology
Tanakh at Qumran
Textual criticism
The Trackers of Oxyrhynchus
Zooniverse - Ancient Lives
Serapeum of Alexandria

References

External links

The Oxyrhynchus papyri (1898 publication by S.H. Hunt)
 Oxford University: Oxyrhynchus Papyri Project
 Oxyrhynchus Online
 Table of Contents. The Oxyrhynchus Papyri.
 Trismegistos.org Online database of ancient manuscripts.
 GPBC: Gazetteer of Papyri in British Collections
 The Duke Databank of Documentary Papyri. P. Oxy.: The Oxyrhynchus Papyri.
 Wieland Willker Complete List of Greek NT Papyri
 The papyri on line
The Oxyrhynchus papyri vol. I, edited with translations and notes by Bernard P. Grenfell and Arthur S. Hunt at the Internet Archive
The Oxyrhynchus papyri vol. II, edited with translations and notes by Bernard P. Grenfell and Arthur S. Hunt at the Internet Archive
The Oxyrhynchus papyri vol. III, edited with translations and notes by Bernard P. Grenfell and Arthur S. Hunt at the Internet Archive
The Oxyrhynchus papyri vol. III, edited with translations and notes by Bernard P. Grenfell and Arthur S. Hunt, Cornell University Library Historical Monographs Collection. Digitized by Cornell University Library Digital Collections
The Oxyrhynchus papyri vol. IV, edited with translations and notes by Bernard P. Grenfell and Arthur S. Hunt, at the Internet Archive
The Oxyrhynchus papyri vol. V, edited with translations and notes by Bernard P. Grenfell and Arthur S. Hunt, at the Internet Archive
The Oxyrhynchus papyri vol. VI, edited with translations and notes by Bernard P. Grenfell and Arthur S. Hunt, at the Internet Archive
The Oxyrhynchus papyri vol. VII, edited with translations and notes by  Arthur S. Hunt, at the Internet Archive
The Oxyrhynchus papyri vol. VIII, edited with translations and notes by Arthur S. Hunt, at the Internet Archive
The Oxyrhynchus papyri vol. IX, edited with translations and notes by  Arthur S. Hunt, at the Internet Archive
The Oxyrhynchus papyri vol. X, edited with translations and notes by Bernard P. Grenfell and Arthur S. Hunt, Cornell University Library Historical Monographs Collection.  Digitized by Cornell University Library Digital Collections 
The Oxyrhynchus papyri vol. X, edited with translations and notes by Bernard P. Grenfell and Arthur S. Hunt, at the Internet Archive
The Oxyrhynchus papyri vol. XI, edited with translations and notes by Bernard P. Grenfell and Arthur S. Hunt, at the Internet Archive
The Oxyrhynchus papyri vol. XII, edited with translations and notes by Bernard P. Grenfell and Arthur S. Hunt, at the Internet Archive
The Oxyrhynchus papyri vol. XIII, edited with translations and notes by Bernard P. Grenfell and Arthur S. Hunt, at the Internet Archive
The Oxyrhynchus papyri vol. XIV, edited with translations and notes by Bernard P. Grenfell and Arthur S. Hunt, at the Internet Archive
The Oxyrhynchus papyri vol. XV, edited with translations and notes by Bernard P. Grenfell and Arthur S. Hunt at the Internet Archive
The Oxyrhynchus papyri vol. I - XV  (single indexed PDF file)

 
1st-millennium BC manuscripts
1st-millennium manuscripts
Archaeological corpora
Egyptian papyri
Manuscripts
Oxyrhynchus
Papyrus collections
History of Phoenicia